Habib Swaleh or Salih bin Alawi Jamal al-Layl (1853-1936) was an Islamic scholar who resided in Lamu, Kenya.

Life

He initiated the annual Maulid Festival in Lamu, which became an annual event. attracting visitors from various countries. Habib Swaleh was also a herbalist who specialized in Islamic traditional medicine. He died in 1935 C.E in Lamu.

References

External links
 Lamu's Sacred Meadows, The Fountain Magazine, April - June 1995, Issue 10

Hadhrami people
Kenyan people of Comorian descent
Kenyan people of Yemeni descent
Kenyan Sufis
Kenyan Islamic religious leaders
Kenyan Muslims
People from Lamu Archipelago
1936 deaths
1853 births